Events from the year 1711 in art.

Events
October 16 – Académie Royale des Beaux-Arts established in Brussels.
Fresco of c.1480 by Melozzo da Forlì in Santi Apostoli, Rome, dismembered and distributed to other locations in the city.

Paintings
 Manuel Arellano paints the earliest prototypes of the casta genre works.
 Sir Godfrey Kneller paints Sir Christopher Wren.
 Sebastiano Ricci paints Esther before Ahasuerus and Moses saved from the waters

Births
 January 28 – Johan Hörner, Swedish-Danish painter (died 1763)
 March 5 – Carl Gustaf Pilo, Swedish-born artist and painter (died 1793)
 September 2 – Noël Hallé, French painter, draftsman and printmaker (died 1781)
 November 19 – Mikhail Lomonosov, Russian polymath, scientist and writer, and mosaic artist (died 1765)
 date unknown – Jacopo Marieschi, Italian vedute painter (died 1794)
 probable
 Prince Hoare, English sculptor (died 1769)
 Miguel Posadas, Spanish painter (died 1753)
 Erik Westzynthius the Elder, Finnish painter (died 1757)
 Giuseppe Zocchi, Italian veduta painter and printmaker (died 1767)

Deaths
January 24 – Jean Bérain the Elder, French draughtsman and designer, painter and engraver (born 1640)
May 14 – Juan Conchillos Falco, Spanish painter (born 1641)
May 24 (bur.) – John Closterman, Westphalian portrait painter (born 1660)
June ? – Gerard de Lairesse, Dutch Golden Age painter and art theorist (born 1641)
December 18 – Louis de Deyster, Flemish painter (born 1656)
date unknown
Étienne Baudet, French engraver (born 1636)
Maria Vittoria Cassana, Italian painter of the late-Baroque (date of birth unknown)
Francisco de Artiga, Spanish landscape and historical painter (born 1650)
Francisco Leonardoni, Italian painter active mainly in Spain (born 1654)
Jerzy Siemiginowski-Eleuter, Polish painter and engraver (born 1660)
Domenico Maria Viani, Italian painter of churches, born in Bologna (born 1668)

 
Years of the 18th century in art
1710s in art